The Hannah Arendt Institute for Totalitarianism Studies (German: Hannah-Arendt-Institut für Totalitarismusforschung, abbreviated HAIT) is a research institute hosted by Dresden University of Technology and devoted to the comparative analysis of dictatorships. The institute focusses particularly on the structures of Nazism and Communism as well as on the presuppositions and consequences of the two ideological dictatorships. The institute is named after the German-American philosopher and political scientist Hannah Arendt, whose magnum opus The Origins of Totalitarianism (1951) is considered across disciplines as one of the most influential works of the 20th century and continues to shape in particular scholarly discussions of totalitarian systems of political domination.

The initiative for establishing the HAIT originated in the nearly 60-year, double dictatorship experience of Eastern Germany and in the Enlightenment-driven Peaceful Revolution of 1989/90, and goes back to former civil rights activists who, as members of the Saxon State Parliament, brought about an Act of Parliament setting up the institute in November 1991. The institute began operation on June 17, 1993, under the direction of the historian of Eastern Europe .

Research profile 
In keeping with the entirety of Hannah Arendt's work, research activities of the institute named after her – the HAIT – focus on the comparative analysis of dictatorships while also reflecting on the historical and political conditions of liberal-democratic polities. In accordance with the institute's statutes, the systematic study of political, social and cultural developments during the Nazi and SED dictatorships lies at the heart of its work. Particular attention is devoted to the analysis of opposition and resistance to these two German dictatorships of the 20th century. In addition, international as well as intertemporal comparative perspectives on other fascist and state-socialist regimes belong to the research programme, as does analysis of the political, economic and social transformations in the post-Communist countries after 1989. The institute also devotes research to current challenges and dangers faced by democracy, in particular from autocratic and fundamentalist regimes as well as extremist, racist and anti-Semitic attitudes and movements.

In line with these perspectives, work at the HAIT currently breaks down into five fields of research: 
 Research on the Nazi dictatorship;
 Research in the history of Communist dictatorships, especially the former German Democratic Republic under the SED regime;
 Transformation research on the post-socialist period from an internationally comparative perspective;
 Theoretical and intellectual-historical foundations of dictatorship research;
 Research on political extremism.

A central part of activities at the HAIT lies in conveying, in accordance with the institute's statutes, its own research results to the general public. In keeping with this endeavour, continual collaboration occurs with various memorial sites, organisations supporting historical and political education, teacher training institutions, schools and players from civil society, who regularly avail themselves of the institute's range of services in consulting, continuing education and lectures.

Publications 
In the classical print media segment, the range of publications from the HAIT comprises an academic journal as well as four academic book series, in part published in collaboration with co-operation partners. In March 2020 HAIT has started curating his own science blog Denken ohne Geländer [″Thinking Without a Banister″], and in September 2020 it has launched its own Twitter channel @HAIT_TUD. In addition, the institute makes available several databases focussing on contemporary history to the academic research community.

Journal 
 The institute's journal, has been published twice a year since 2004 at Vandenhoeck & Ruprecht and provides an interdisciplinary platform for comparative research on non-democratic systems and movements in history and the present, and for analysis of the preconditions of liberal-democratic societies. Since 2020 it is published also in an open access version.

Book series 
 The series Schriften des Hannah-Arendt-Instituts [″Writings from the Hannah Arendt Institute″] has appeared since 1995 – originally at Böhlau Verlag, and since 2004 at Vandenhoeck & Ruprecht – and serves the publication of comprehensive research results in the history of Nazism, Communism and the transformation after 1989, as well as research on the manifestations of political extremism throughout history and in the present day. The 66 volumes published to date (status: December 2020) comprise both monographs and conference documentation.
 The series Berichte und Studien [″Reports and Studies″] appearing since 1995 – originally published by the institute, and starting in 2004 by V&R unipress – contains studies of narrower scope tied to the institute's programme and devoted to German and (Eastern) European regional history and political extremism in Saxony. The series currently comprises 84 monographs and anthologies (status: December 2020).
 The series Wege der Totalitarismusforschung [″Pathways of Totalitarianism Research″] has been published since 2009 by Vandenhoeck & Ruprecht and disseminates foundational works in totalitarianism studies which, either out of print or forgotten, have in part also remained neglected. The five volumes published so far (status: December 2020) are devoted to pertinent work by Richard Löwenthal, Jacob Talmon, Aleksander Hertz, Aurel Kolnai and Luigi Sturzo.
 The series Lebenszeugnisse – Leidenswege [″Testimonies – Ordeals″], published by the institute itself since 1996 in co-operation with the Saxon Memorial Foundation and conceived for political education, presents (auto)biographical reports of victims of political tyranny. The series comprises 26 volumes to date (status: December 2020).

Databases 
 The database on the Saxon NSDAP daily newspaper  [″The Struggle for Freedom″], under development at the HAIT since 2017 as part of the joint project Virtual Archive for Research in the Humanities, itself coordinated by the Saxon Academy of Sciences and Humanities, allows open access searching of data and events pertaining to the regional history of National Socialism in the newspaper collection comprising around 66,000 pages. So far the period of 1930 through 1937 has been released (status: December 2020), with further years through 1945 to become successively available following processing. In co-operation with the Saxon State and University Library Dresden (SLUB) work is currently in progress on providing greater open access (in the past full text digital copies were viewable merely via user access at workstations of the SLUB or Institute library) as well as further digital options.
The freely accessible online search tool offers, among other things, access to the individual investigatory decisions along with argumentation.
The standardised information on SMT activities comprises, among other things, names of the persons concerned, grounds for judgements, sentences and release dates, and if necessary can be individually requested or even researched at a workstation in the institute library.
 Earlier research projects on the Peaceful Revolution in Saxony led at the institute to the creation of a database containing around 1,400 files, each with multiple scanned archived documents and documenting, in chronological order, the 1989–90 political developments of all groups of the population in the former GDR districts Dresden, Leipzig and Karl-Marx-Stadt. Access is available locally on request at a workstation of the institute library.

Institute library 
The HAIT maintains its own special library, with currently around 52,500 volumes (status: December 2020) available to both the academic community and the general public for use on site. The collection areas are largely geared to the institute's research specialisations. Priority is accordingly given to literature on the history of National Socialism, the history of the Soviet Occupation Zone/GDR, the history of the transformation after 1989 and on dictatorships and political extremism in Europe. Comprehensive holdings of around 550 pertinent journals and newspapers are also available.

Evaluation 
In March 2019 an expert committee appointed by the German Council of Science and Humanities and headed by  conducted an evaluation that found the institute to be an ″important driving force for research in contemporary history and political science″ that has made ″valuable and indispensable contributions to both academic support of the remembrance of victims of the Nazi dictatorship and the SED regime and of political education in Saxony in general″.

Committees and people 
The HAIT has the legal form of a registered association, with juridical persons governed by private or public law – such as the Free State of Saxony, represented by the Saxon State Ministry for Science, Culture and Tourism – serving as members with voting power. According to its statutes, management of the association falls to a chairperson officially designated as the ″director”, who conducts ongoing business and is assisted by his or her two deputies. The director is appointed by the board of trustees in consultation with the Academic advisory council for a term of five years after having been proposed by a joint search committee of Dresden University of Technology and HAIT. He or she is also holding a regular professorship at Dresden University of Technology. The Board of trustees supervises the fulfilment of association's duties in conformity with the statutes. It consists of seven members with voting power, who as representatives of various institutions designated in the statutes are elected or appointed for a term of five years. The Academic advisory council advises the board of trustees and the director on all significant academic matters. It has between five and nine members with voting power, each of whom is appointed for a term of five years by Dresden University of Technology, Leipzig University or by the board of trustees in consultation with the director.

Directorate 
 Currently
 Uwe Backes – Deputy Director (since 1999)
  – Director (since 2017)
 Clemens Vollnhals – Deputy Director (since 1998), acting Director (2007–2009, 2016–2017)

 Formerly
 Gerhard Besier – Director (2003–2008)
  – Director (1993–1995)
  – Director (1997–2002)
  – Director (2009–2016)
  – Acting Director (2002–2003)
  – Deputy Director (1994–1997), acting Director (1995–1997)

Sponsoring association 
  (since 2006)
  (since 1993)
 Thomas Lindenberger (since 2017)
 Matthias Rößler (since 1993)
  (since 2004)
 Center for Research on Antisemitism at the Technical University of Berlin (since 2018) – currently represented by Stefanie Schüler-Springorum
 Collegium Carolinum, Munich (since 2018) – currently represented by 
 Dresden University of Technology (since 2008) – currently represented by 
 Free State of Saxony, represented by Saxon State Ministry for Science, Culture and Tourism (since 1993) – currently represented by Caroline Wagner
 , Dresden (since 2008) – currently represented by 
 Leibniz Institute for the History and Culture of Eastern Europe, Leipzig (since 2008) – currently represented by 
 , Leipzig (since 2008) – currently represented by 
 Saxon Academy of Sciences and Humanities (since 2008) – currently represented by

Board of trustees 
 , representative of the Academic advisory council (since 2017)
  – deputy chairperson, representative of the Dresden University of Technology (since 2020)
 Thomas Lindenberger – in an advisory capacity, Director of the HAIT (since 2017)
 , representative of the Landtag of the Free State of Saxony (since 2020)
 Martin Schulze Wessel, representative of the General assembly of the Sponsoring association (since 2018)
 , representative of the Academic advisory council (since 2016)
 Caroline Wagner – chairperson, representative of the Saxon State Ministry for Science, Culture and Tourism (since 2009)
 Hans Wiesmeth, representative of the Saxon Academy of Sciences and Humanities (since 2015)

Academic advisory council 
 , Andrássy University Budapest (since 2019)
 , Karl Franzens University of Graz (since 2012)
 Alfons Kenkmann – chairperson, Leipzig University (since 2014)
 , University of Geneva (since 2018)
 , Albert Ludwig University of Freiburg (since 2016)
 , Leipzig University (since 2017)
 Sybille Steinbacher, Frankfurt am Main (since 2018)
 , Institute for Contemporary History at the Czech Academy of Sciences, Prague (since 2010)
 Hans Vorländer – deputy chairperson, Dresden University of Technology (since 2014)

References

Further reading

External links

TU Dresden
Research institutes in Germany
Political research institutes
History institutes
1993 establishments in Germany